Burroughs may refer to:

 Former spelling of boroughs
Burroughs, Georgia, a historically African American community now a neighborhood of Savannah, Georgia
 Burroughs Corporation, a maker of adding machines and computers
 Burroughs (surname), people and fictional characters
 The Burroughs, a district of London
 Burroughs (crater), on Mars
 21811 Burroughs, an asteroid
 Burroughs School (Conway, South Carolina), on the National Register of Historic Places
 Burroughs: The Movie, a documentary about William S. Burroughs directed by Howard Brookner

See also
 Burrows (disambiguation)